Muhammad Aun Abbas Khan Sial (16 June, 1982 – 31 October, 2021) was a Pakistani politician who was a Member of the Provincial Assembly of the Punjab, from May 2013 to May 2018.

Early life and education
He was born on 16 June 1982 in Lahore. He received his early education from Aitchison College and did ICS from American National School, Lahore. He died on 31 October 2021 due to cardiac arrest.

Political career

He was elected to the Provincial Assembly of the Punjab as an independent candidate from Constituency PP-83 (Jhang-XI) in 2013 Pakistani general election. He joined Pakistan Muslim League (N) in May 2013.

References

1982 births
2021 deaths
Punjab MPAs 2013–2018
Pakistan Muslim League (N) politicians
Politicians from Lahore